Manav Soneji is an Indian actor. He is known for playing character as Jaman in Anandibaa Aur Emily, as Phitkari in Kaatelal & Sons, as Ali in Mere Sai and as Vicky in Gujarat 11.

Career 
Soneji made his debut in 2015 with the TV serial Palak Pe Jhalak .
In 2017 he acted as Hansal Sahu in Web-series Lakhon Mein Ek.
In 2019 Soneji played as Ali in TV Series Mere Sai and as Vicky in Film Gujarat 11.
In 2020 he acted as Phitkari in Kaatelal & Sons.
He played as Patkan in TV mini series Dil-E-Couch in 2021.
In 2022, Soneji acted as Jaman in Anandibaa Aur Emily.

Filmography

References

Indian male television actors
Year of birth missing (living people)
Living people
21st-century Indian male actors